The 1975 Men's World Water Polo Championship was the second edition of the men's water polo tournament at the World Aquatics Championships, organised by the world governing body in aquatics, the FINA. The tournament was held from 19 to 26 July 1975, and was incorporated into the 1975 World Aquatics Championships in Cali, Colombia.

Participating teams

Groups formed

GROUP A

GROUP B

GROUP C

GROUP D

Preliminary round

Group A

 19 July 1975

 20 July 1975

 21 July 1975

Group B

 19 July 1975

 20 July 1975

 21 July 1975

Group C

 19 July 1975

 20 July 1975

 21 July 1975

Group D

 19 July 1975

 20 July 1975

 21 July 1975

Second round

Group E

Preliminary round results apply.

 22 July 1975

 23 July 1975

 24 July 1975

Group F

Preliminary round results apply.

 22 July 1975

 23 July 1975

Group G

Preliminary round results apply.

 22 July 1975

 23 July 1975

 24 July 1975

Group H

Preliminary round results apply.

 22 July 1975

 23 July 1975

Final round

13th – 16th places (Group K)

 25 July 1975

 26 July 1975

 27 July 1975

9th – 12th places (Group J)

 25 July 1975

 26 July 1975

 27 July 1975

5th – 8th places (Group I)

 25 July 1975

 26 July 1975

 27 July 1975

1st - 4th places Final standings (Group L)

 25 July 1975

 26 July 1975

 27 July 1975

Final ranking

Medalists

References

External links
  World Championships 1975, Cali - Water polo Men's Tournament www.fina.org
 Men Water Polo World Championship 1975 Cali www.todor66.com
 Results

Men
1975
1975 in Colombian sport